Empis digramma is a species of dance flies, in the fly family Empididae. It is included in the subgenus Xanthempis. The thorax is gray with yellowish sides, with two dark stripes following the line of the dorsocentral bristles. Abdomen is gray upper and yellowish on the sides.

References

Empis
Diptera of Europe
Insects described in 1835
Taxa named by Johann Wilhelm Meigen